The Shire of Barcoo is a local government area in Central West Queensland, Australia. In June 2018, the shire had a population of 267 people.

It is named for the Barcoo River which reaches a confluence with the Thomson River in the shire to form Cooper Creek.

The major industry in the shire is beef production and some opal mining.  There has been some development of the known oil and gas reserves in the region.

History 

Kuungkari (also known as Kungkari and Koonkerri) is a language of Western Queensland. The Kuungkari language region includes the landscape within the local government boundaries of Longreach Shire Council and Blackall-Tambo Shire Council.

The Barcoo Division was created on 24 December 1887 out of the eastern part of the Diamantina Division, and was subject to the Divisional Boards Act 1887.

In 1927, the council met at Stonehenge.

With the passage of the Local Authorities Act 1902, Barcoo Division became the Shire of Barcoo on 31 March 1903.

It subsequently lost areas when the shires of Isisford (1908) and Quilpie (1930) were incorporated.

Its present mayor, Sally O'Neil, has been in office since 2020.

Towns and localities 
The Shire of Barcoo includes the following settlements:

 Jundah
 Farrars Creek
 Stonehenge
 Tanbar Station
 Windorah

Chairmen and mayors

 1927: H. J. Cameron
 2000–2012: Bruce Scott (unopposed 2008)
 2012–2016: Julie Groves (unopposed)
 2016–2020 : Bruce Scott
2020–present: Sally Elizabeth O'Neil

Population

Libraries
The Barcoo Shire Council operates public libraries at Jundah, Stonehenge, and Windorah.

References

Further reading

External links
 

 
Local government areas of Queensland
1887 establishments in Australia
Central West Queensland